Michael Souza (born January 28, 1978) often referred to as Mike Souza, is a former Italian-American professional ice hockey forward who currently is the head coach of the University of New Hampshire men's ice hockey team.

Playing career
Souza was born in Wakefield, Massachusetts. Souza attended the University of New Hampshire from 1996 to 2000. He is a cousin of fellow UNH player Paul Thompson. In 1997 Souza was drafted 67th overall by the Chicago Blackhawks in the 1997 NHL Entry Draft. At UNH, Souza was noted for his speed and skating skill. In 1999 UNH reached the championship game of the 1999 NCAA Division I Men's Ice Hockey Tournament. In the championship game Souza scored a key goal in the third period to force overtime. Maine won in overtime, however. In 2000 Souza was a member of the Hockey East All Star team.

After leaving UNH he played in the AHL for three seasons with the Norfolk Admirals and the Bridgeport Sound Tigers. In 2001 and 2002 he attended the Chicago Blackhawks' training camp. The next two seasons Souza split his time between the ECHL and the AHL, playing for the Florence Pride and Reading Royals of the ECHL, and the Portland Pirates, Bridgeport Sound Tigers, and Hershey Bears of the AHL.

In 2005 Souza began to play in Europe. In the 2005–06 season Souza played for the Kölner Haie of the Deutsche Eishockey Liga, EHC Basel of the Swiss National League A, and EHC Olten of the Swiss National League B. In 2006, he moved to Italy to play in the Serie A. He played with SG Cortina for four seasons before moving to the Bolzano-Bozen Foxes in 2010.

International career
By playing in Italy, Souza later gained Italian citizenship and participated at the 2009 and 2010 IIHF World Championship as a member of the Italy men's national ice hockey team.

Coaching career
Souza retired in 2011 and became an assistant ice hockey coach with Brown University. In 2013, he became an assistant coach with the University of Connecticut, and in 2015 he joined the staff at the University of New Hampshire. On March 14, 2018, Souza officially took over as the head coach of the Wildcats, replacing the retiring Dick Umile.

Career statistics

Awards and honors

Head Coaching Record

References

External links
 Official Biography, New Hampshire Wildcats

1978 births
American men's ice hockey forwards
Bolzano HC players
Bridgeport Sound Tigers players
Chicago Blackhawks draft picks
Florence Pride players
Hershey Bears players
EHC Basel players
Ice hockey coaches from Massachusetts
Italian ice hockey players
Kölner Haie players
Living people
New Hampshire Wildcats men's ice hockey players
Norfolk Admirals players
EHC Olten players
People from Wakefield, Massachusetts
Reading Royals players
SG Cortina players
Sportspeople from Middlesex County, Massachusetts
University of New Hampshire alumni
American people of Portuguese descent
American people of Italian descent
Ice hockey players from Massachusetts